Adolf I may refer to:

 Adolf I of Lotharingia (died 1018), Vogt of Deutz
 Adolf I of Berg (died 1086)
 Adolf I of Holstein (died 1130), Count of Schauenburg
 Adolf I, Archbishop of Cologne or Adolf of Altena or Adolf of Berg (c. 1157–1220)
 Adolf I, Count of the Mark (1194–1249)
 Adolf I, Prince of Schaumburg-Lippe (1817–1893)
 Adolf I of Luxembourg (1817–1905)

See also 
 Adolph I (disambiguation)